The Associated Daughters of Early American Witches is a lineage-based membership organization for women who are directly descended from a person accused of witchcraft in the witch trials of Colonial America.

Founding 
The society was established in 1985 in Washington, D.C. and formally incorporated in 1986. The first organizational meeting of the society was held in April 1987 at the Mayflower Hotel with 35 charter members. The organization received its 501(c)(3) organization status in 1990. The society is listed in the Hereditary Society Community of the United States of America.

Structure 
Membership in the society is by invitation only. To become a member, a woman must be at least sixteen years of age and able to prove lineal bloodline descent from an ancestor who was accused, tried, and/or executed for the practice of witchcraft prior to December 31, 1699, in Colonial America.

The society is led by 8 officers, including a President General, First Vice President General, Second Vice President General, Recording Secretary General, Corresponding Secretary General, Treasurer General, Registrar General, and Historian General.

The society maintains a Roll of Ancestors which currently includes the full names of over 300 ancestors.

List of qualifying ancestors 
As of 2012, the below named individuals are listed as qualifying ancestors in the society's Roll of Ancestors. They are listed in the full registry by name, spouses (if applicable), colony, and the year of their first accusation or trial. The full registry also includes partial names and surnames if no first name is available.

See also 

 The Hereditary Society Community of the United States of America
 Witch trials

References

External links 

 Associated Daughters of Early American Witches, Official website

History of women in the United States
Women's organizations based in the United States
Lineage societies
Genealogical societies in the United States
Organizations established in 1986